George Millward McDougall (September 9, 1821 – January 25, 1876) was a Methodist missionary in Canada who assisted in negotiations leading to Treaty 6 and Treaty 7 between the Canadian government and the Indian tribes of western Canada.  He was also responsible for the theft of the Manitou Stone. Holly Quan wrote: "To the Blackfoot and Cree of the western plains, the Iron Stone was the embodiment of powerful spirits, a source of strength, power, protection and luck...To the Reverend George McDougall, the Iron Stone was a pagan symbol. With considerable effort, in the early spring of 1866 he had the stone dug from its resting place...to be proudly displayed on the lawn of the Methodist college where he was trained...That spring, when the Cree and Blackfoot came again to visit the Iron Stone...their link with the buffalo spirits...had mysteriously vanished. The elders predicted war  disease and starvation. All their predictions came true."

Biography
McDougall was born in Kingston, Ontario (then Upper Canada).  In 1842 he married Elizabeth Chantler and they eventually had nine children.   After attending Victoria College in Cobourg, he was ordained in 1854. In 1860 he was sent to the Rossville near Norway House. In 1863 he established the Victoria Mission near Edmonton, the earliest Methodist mission in the West, and was superintendent of Methodist missionary work in the Saskatchewan District. In 1871 he founded a permanent mission at Edmonton House, a Hudson's Bay Company outpost at what is now Edmonton, Alberta. McDougall also helped prepare the Natives for the signing of Treaty 6 and Treaty 7. He died in a blizzard while on a buffalo hunt near what is now Calgary, Alberta. There is a cairn to mark the place of George's death, on Panora Way NW in Calgary. 

He and his son John McDougall served missions over a wide area, ministering to Indian groups at Pigeon Lake, Stoney Lake, Saddle Lake and Whitefish Lake.

He and his son founded the McDougall Orphanage and Home, an Indian residential school, in about 1875. The school closed in 1910.

George extended his ministry to southern Alberta, establishing a mission - McDougall Mission - on the Bow River named Morleyville. It was on a hunting trip in January 1876 near the Nose Hill area that Rev. George McDougall was lost in a blizzard and was found dead several days later.

An indication of his influence in the creation of present-day Alberta can be found in the large number of memorials that have been established throughout the province, including hospitals, schools and other local landmarks.

See also 
Morley, Alberta

References 

6. Quan, Holly (2009). Native Chiefs and Famous Métis. Heritage House Publishing.

Bibliography

External links 
 McDougall Stoney Mission Society

Canadian Methodist missionaries
1821 births
1876 deaths
People from Kingston, Ontario
Methodist missionaries in Canada